Polagam is a revenue village in the Karaikal taluk of Karaikal District. It is situated at a distance of about 8 kilometres south-west of Karaikal town and 2 kilometres south of Tirumalarajanpattinam commune.

References 

 

Villages in Karaikal district